Tvarditsa is a village in Shabla Municipality, in the Dobrich Province of northeastern Bulgaria.

References

Villages in Dobrich Province